Claus (sometimes Clas) is both a given name and a German, Danish, and Dutch surname. Notable people with the name include:

Given name
Claus Schenk Graf von Stauffenberg (1907–1944), a German officer who, along with others, attempted to assassinate Hitler in 1944
Claus von Amsberg, Prince Claus of the Netherlands, Jonkheer van Amsberg (1926–2002)
Claus von Bülow (born 1926), British socialite accused of attempting to murder his wife, Sunny von Bülow
Claus Clausen (disambiguation), three people of that name
Claus Bech Jørgensen (born 1976), Danish-born Faroese footballer
Claus Jacob (born 1969), German scientist
Claus Jørgensen (racewalker) (born 1974), Danish race walker
Claus Larsen (disambiguation), three people of that name
Claus Lundekvam (born 1973), Norwegian former footballer
Claus Moser, Baron Moser (born 1922), British statistician
Claus Nielsen (born 1964), Danish former football striker
Claus Norreen (born 1970), Danish musician with the band Aqua, and record producer
Claus Offe (born 1940), political sociologist
Claus Ogerman (born 1930), German arranger, orchestrator, conductor and composer
Claus Schilling (1871-1946), German experimenter in Nazi human concentration camp experiments executed for war crimes
Claus Sievert (1949–2009), German-born American printmaker and illustrator.
Claus Sluter (1340s-1405 or 1406), Dutch sculptor
Claus Spreckels (1828-1908), major industrialist in Hawai'i and California
Claus Thomsen (born 1970), Danish former footballer
Claus Toksvig (1929-1988), Danish journalist, broadcaster and politician

Surname
Carl Friedrich Claus (1827-1900), German chemist
Carl Friedrich Wilhelm Claus (1835–1899), German zoologist
Daniel Claus (1727-1787), British commissioner of Indian affairs and a Loyalist during the American Revolution
Emile Claus (1849–1924), Belgian painter, inventor of the Luminism style of Impressionistic painting
Hildrun Claus (born 1939), German former athlete
Hugo Claus (1929–2008), Flemish novelist, poet, playwright, painter and film director 
Karl Ernst Claus or Carl Ernst Claus (1796–1864), Livonian chemist and naturalist, discoverer of the element ruthenium
Roland Claus (born 1954), German politician
Santa Claus (politician) (born 1947), American politician from Alaska

Fictional characters
Santa Claus
Mrs. Claus, Santa's wife
Claus, a character and a protagonists twin in the Nintendo game Mother 3
Claus, in the advertising campaign for Palm Centro

Organisations 
FC Santa Claus, a Finnish association football club

See also
Claus process, the major process for removing elemental S from H2S gas
Klaus (disambiguation)
Clauss

Masculine given names
Surnames from given names